The Zanzottera MZ 201 and MZ 202 are a family of twin-cylinder, in-line two-stroke, dual ignition aircraft engines designed for ultralight aircraft and motor gliders.

The engine was originally designed and produced by Zanzottera Technologies of Italy, but the design was sold, along with the rest of the company's two-stroke ultralight aircraft engine line, to Compact Radial Engines of Surrey, British Columbia, Canada. Compact Radial Engines was then in turn acquired by Fiate Aviation Co., Ltd. of Hefei, Anhui, China in August 2017.

Development
The MZ 202 was developed first as a  lightweight competitor to the liquid-cooled  Rotax 582. Later the MZ 201 was developed from the MZ 202 as a de-rated  version intended for motorgliders and single place ultralights that needed more power than the single-cylinder Zanzottera MZ 34.

The MZ 201 and 202 both have a cylinder barrels that are Nikasil-coated. The bore and stroke are the same as the single-cylinder MZ 34 engine. The MZ 201 features an optional recoil starter or electric starting, while the MZ 202 has electric starting only. The MZ 201 has a choice of a reduction drive belt or gearbox, while the MZ 202 offers just the gearbox with reduction ratios of 2.18, 2.55, 2.88, 3.11 or 3.66 to 1.

The owners manual acknowledges the limitations inherent in the design of the engine, stating:

Variants
MZ 201
Twin-cylinder, air-cooled, two-stroke dual ignition  aircraft engine optimized for motorgliders and single place ultralights. Equipped with a single Tillotson carburetor.
MZ 202
Twin-cylinder, air-cooled, two-stroke dual ignition  aircraft engine. Equipped with dual Bing carburetors.
MZ 202i
Twin-cylinder, air-cooled, two-stroke dual ignition  aircraft engine. Equipped with electronic fuel injection, controlled by a computerized engine management system. No longer in production

Applications
MZ 201
Belite Aircraft Superlite
SlipStream Scepter
SNAS Stryke-Air Bi
Spacek SD-1 Minisport
Star Bee Light
Taggart GyroBee
Wings of Freedom Flitplane
MZ 202
ASAP Beaver Plus 2
Apex Cross 5
Innovator Mosquito Air
Mosquito Aviation XE
Sabre Wildcat
Star Bee Total Bee

Specifications (MZ 202)

See also

References

External links
Official MZ 201 website
Official MZ 202 website

Compact Radial Engines aircraft engines
Zanzottera aircraft engines
Air-cooled aircraft piston engines
Two-stroke aircraft piston engines